Moth traps are devices used by entomologists to capture moths. Most use a light source. Pheromone traps are also used.

All moth traps  follow the same basic design - consisting of a mercury vapour or actinic light to attract the moths and a box in which the moths can accumulate  and be examined later. The moths fly towards the light and spiral down towards the source of the light and are deflected into the box. Besides moths, several other insects will also come to light, such as scarab beetles, Ichneumonid wasps, stink bugs, stick insects, diving beetles, and water boatmen. Occasionally diurnal species such as dragonflies, yellowjacket wasps, and hover flies will also visit.

The reason insects, and especially particular families of insects (e.g. moths), are attracted to light is uncertain. The most accepted theory is that moths migrate using the moon and stars as navigational aids, and that the placement of a closer-than-the-moon light causes subtended angles of light at the insect's eye to alter so rapidly that it has to fly in a spiral to reduce the angular change. This results in the insect flying into the artificial light. Yet the reason some diurnal insects visit is entirely unknown. 

Some moths, notably Sesiidae are monitored or collected  using  pheromone traps.

See also 
 Bug zapper
 Mosquito net

References
Paul Waring, 2001 A Guide to Moth Traps and Their Use Amateur Entomologists' Society.

External links

Moth-trapping Part I: Basic equipment
Moth-trapping Part II: Methods and techniques
Moth Recorders Handbook
Moth Traps and Treatment

Entomology equipment
Lepidopterology
Animal trapping
Environmental Sampling Equipment